RBSS may refer to:

 Robinson Secondary School, a six-year public school in the US state of Virginia.
 Raqqa Is Being Slaughtered Silently, a citizen journalism effort in the ISIS occupied Syrian city of Raqqa.